This page provides supplementary chemical data on Menthol.

Material Safety Data Sheet  

The handling of this chemical may incur notable safety precautions. It is highly recommended that you seek the Material Safety Datasheet (MSDS) for this chemical from a reliable source  such as SIRI or the links below, and follow its directions.
Baker MSDS (l-form)
Fisher MSDS (DL or racemic form)
Fisher MSDS (l-form)
Ambix MSDS Menthol Eucalyptus ointment

Structure and properties

Thermodynamic properties

Spectral data

References

Chemical data pages
Chemical data pages cleanup